Feyzabad
Feyẕābād, Faizābād, and Feyzābād) is a city and capital of Mahvelat County, in Razavi Khorasan Province, Iran. At the 2006 census, its population was 14,721, in 3,827 families. It is located about 200 km from Mashhad.

Industry
In the field of industry, the city has an industrial area with all the necessary infrastructure for investment, which has a total area of 106 hectares and has an operational phase and 2 active industrial units.

The most important industrial and mining units of the city are 6 mines, which mainly have products of industrial soil, carcass stone and gypsum, which have an annual extraction rate of 25 to 30 thousand tons.

Regarding the processing of Mehwalat pistachio, which is processed in the same city, Mehwalat has 41 pistachio recording terminals with 55 processing lines, which employ 70 to 80 workers per day in each working season, which is 55 thousand tons per year.  Pistachios are processed.

There are 15 active workshops and handicrafts in the city, of which there are currently 15 carpet weaving workshops, 5 carpet weaving units, 6 carpet weaving units, 2 kilim weaving units and 2 mosaic work units in the city, which have more than 220 licenses so far.  Household jobs are also exported.

In the field of cooperatives, considering that cooperatives are one of the successful economic and social models in the world, he said: "Currently, there are more than 50 active cooperatives with 600 members in Mahvelat."

The economy of Mahwalat city is based on agriculture, so that the agricultural sector has 70%, services 20% and industry 7.5%

Mehvalat city is the largest orchard city in Khorasan Razavi province, so that it has the first place in the area under cultivation and production of two important and strategic products, pistachio and pomegranate in the region.

Economic characteristics 
The capabilities of Mahvelat city in the field of agriculture and animal husbandry are of special importance as with 42558 hectares of land under cultivation of horticultural and agricultural products is one of the agricultural hubs of the province and the country,And this city with 5250 hectares of fertile pistachio orchards and production of 8995 tons of dried pistachios and 42% of pistachios in the province and 1695 hectares of pomegranate orchards and production of 28035 tons of pomegranates and 32% of pomegranates in the province has the first place of production of these two products in the province.  Cotton cultivated lands account for 9% of the province's cotton.

Cultivation in Mehvelat as 22,000 hectares and the average annual production as 100 to 110,000 tons. Of this amount, 22,000 tons of dried pistachios are processed and sent to consumer markets.

Commodity Exchange
Pistachio Commodity Exchange

In this exchange, hazelnut pistachio, which is a first-class product and the so-called "thirty, thirty-two" pistachios will be offered with a capacity of one hundred tons.

Diba Pistachio Company has a standard warehouse with a capacity of about 7,000 tons. In the first stage, a warehouse with a capacity of 100 tons for accepting standard products from farmers in Khorasan region in the commodity exchange has been accepted and the symbol of this warehouse has been inserted.

Regarding the entry of pistachios in the stock market, there is an advantage that the United States is the reference for pistachio prices in world markets, but the Iranian stock price index can also be a reliable source for determining international prices. The area under pistachio cultivation in Khorasan region is increasing due to the tariffs imposed on the import of American agricultural goods to China.

Some pistachio market participants have renamed Faizabad, California.

References 

Populated places in Mahvelat County
Cities in Razavi Khorasan Province